James Adams, (1980-), Hampshire cricketer.
 William Adelin, (1103-1120), only legitimate son and heir of Henry I.
 Bob Anderson (darts player), (1942-), former BDO World darts champion
 Arthur, Prince of Wales, (1486-1502), elder son of Henry VII who pre-deceased his father and therefore never reigned.
 Kevin Ashman, (1959-), World Quiz Champion and Egghead.
 Jon Boden, (1977-), folk musician, brought up in Winchester.
 Wayne Bridge (1980-), International and National footballer, brought up and went to school (Kings School).
 Andy Burrows, (1979-), Razorlight drummer.
 Jon Burton, (1969-), founder of Traveller's Tales
 Alexa Chung, (1983-), model.
 Clive Clark, golfer
 Jamie Cumming, (1999-), goalkeeper for Chelsea.
 Julia Darling, (1956-2005), poet.
 Jack Dee, (1961-), comedian, lived in Winchester from an early age.
 Freeman Dyson, (1923-2020), physicist. 
 Saint Æthelwold, (909-984), Bishop of Winchester.
 George Ferguson, (1947-), architect.
 Colin Firth, (1960-), Academy Award winning actor.
 Philippa Forrester, (1968-), TV and radio presenter.
 Benedict Francis, (1972-), director/actor.
 Frederick "Dickie" Frost (1866-1939), early racing cyclist.
 Brian Froud, (1947-), fantasy artist.
 Chris Green, (1943-), railway manager who created Network SouthEast.
 James Heatly, Commonwealth and European Diver, was born in Winchester.
 Henry III, (1207-1272), King of England.
 Charles Jenkinson, 1st Earl of Liverpool, (1729-1809), statesman.
 George Langdon (1818-1894), cricketer.
 Jon Leyne, (1958-), BBC foreign correspondent, only foreign journalist in Iran during the Green Revolution in 2009
 John Lingard, (1771-1851), Roman Catholic priest and historian.
 Tony Middleton, (1964-), cricketer.
 Terry Paine, (1939-), footballer.
 K.E. (Ken) Palmer MBE, (1937-), cricketer and umpire, Somerset all-rounder who played one Test for England.
 Licoricia of Winchester (d. 1277), Jewish businesswoman.
 Lucy Pinder, (1983-), model.
 Richard, Earl of Cornwall (1209-1272), younger brother of King Henry III., was Count of Poitou (from 1225 to 1243), Earl of Cornwall (from 1227) and German King (formally "King of the Romans", from 1257).
 Kathy Smallwood-Cook, (1960-), athlete and Olympic medallist.
 Saint Swithun, (c800-862), Bishop of Winchester.
 Chris T-T, (1974-), singer-songwriter.
 James Tomlinson, (1982-), Hampshire cricketer.
 Frank Turner, (1981-), singer-songwriter.
 Mary Warnock, Baroness Warnock, (1924-), philosopher and writer on existentialism.
 Peter White, (1947-), blind broadcaster and radio journalist.
 Edward Young, (1683-1765), poet.
 Mark Perego, Wales international rugby union player
 Danny Ings, (1992-), Aston Villa Football Club striker, England 
 James Buckley-Thorp, (1989-), founder of fashion corporation Rupert and Buckley
 Joe Byres, (2000-)

References 

Winchester

People from Winchester